Beard Peak is a peak  high, along the north edge of the La Gorce Mountains, standing  south of the eastern tip of Mount Mooney in Antarctica. It was mapped by the United States Geological Survey from surveys and from U.S. Navy air photos, 1960–63, and named by the Advisory Committee on Antarctic Names for Philip H. Beard, a photographer with U.S. Navy Squadron VX-6 during Operation Deep Freeze 1966 and 1967.

References 

Mountains of Marie Byrd Land